Senator Kleczka may refer to:

Jerry Kleczka (1943–2017), Wisconsin State Senate
John C. Kleczka (1885–1959), Wisconsin State Senate